Curral Velho is a deserted village in the southern part of the island of Boa Vista, Cape Verde. The village is situated on the south coast, around 25 km southeast of the island capital of Sal Rei. The area around Curral Velho is a protected landscape (Paisagem Protegida de Curral Velho), covering . The nearby islet Ilhéu de Curral Velho and the adjacent coast are an important area for birds. The old houses of Curral Velho, São Domingos and Prazeres, examples of traditional Capeverdean architecture, are in a precarious state of conservation.

Gallery

See also
Tourism in Cape Verde

References

Villages and settlements in Boa Vista, Cape Verde